Candelaria is a district of the Palmares canton, in the Alajuela province of Costa Rica.

History 
Candelaria was created on 19 April 1911. Segregated from Atenas canton.

Geography 
Candelaria has an area of  km² and an elevation of  metres.

Demographics 

For the 2011 census, Candelaria had a population of  inhabitants.

Transportation

Road transportation 
The district is covered by the following road routes:
 National Route 135

References 

Districts of Alajuela Province
Populated places in Alajuela Province